The Eparchy of Budimlja and Nikšić or Budimlja–Nikšić is an eparchy (diocese) of the Serbian Orthodox Church, covering eastern, central, and western parts of modern Montenegro. The ecclesiastical seat of the eparchy is the Monastery of Đurđevi Stupovi in Berane. Since 2021 it has been headed by Metodije, bishop of Budimlja and Nikšić.

History
  
  
In 1219, the autocephaly of the Eastern Orthodox Church in medieval Serbia was established by Saint Sava, who was consecrated as the first Serbian archbishop by Patriarch Manuel I of Constantinople and who was residing at that time in Nicaea. On that occasion, the region of Budimlja in the upper Lim valley was detached from the old Eparchy of Raška, and on that territory the new Eparchy of Budimlja was created, centered in the Monastery of Đurđevi Stupovi, previously founded by Stefan Prvoslav, cousin of Saint Sava.

In 1346, the Serbian Archbishopric was raised to the rank of patriarchate, and on the same occasion the Eparchy of Budimlja was raised to the titular (honorary) rank of metropolitanate. In the middle of the 15th century, during the Turkish invasion and conquest, several dioceses of the Serbian Orthodox Church suffered great devastation, including the Eparchy of Budimlja. The Serbian Patriarchate was renewed in 1557 by patriarch Makarije Sokolović, with the Eparchy of Budimlja remaining under its jurisdiction. 

During the Austro-Turkish war (1683–1699) relations between Ottoman authorities and their Serbian subjects deteriorated further. As a result of Ottoman oppression and destruction of churches and monasteries, Serbian Christians and their church leaders, headed by Serbian Patriarch Arsenije III, sided with the Austrians in 1689 and again in 1737 under Serbian Patriarch Arsenije IV. In the following punitive campaigns, the Ottoman armies conducted systematic atrocities against local Christian population in Serbian regions, including the region of Budimlja in the upper Lim valley, resulting in Great Migrations of the Serbs.

By that time, the Eparchy of Budimlja was abolished, and its territory incorporated into neighboring eparchies. In 1938, the historical title of bishops of Budimlja was renewed for auxiliary bishops, and the diocese itself was renewed in 1947 as the Eparchy of Budimlja and Polimlje, and reorganized in 2001 as the Eparchy of Budimlja and Nikšić.

Territory
Today's Eparchy of Budimlja-Nikšić covers 12 municipalities of Montenegro: Andrijevica, Berane, Bijelo Polje, Žabljak, Mojkovac, Nikšić, Petnjica, Plav, Gusinje, Plužine, Rožaje, and Šavnik.

Heads
Titualar bishops of Budimlja (and Polimlje):
 Nikolaj (Jovanović), titular bishop of Budimlja (1938 - 1939)
 Joanikije Lipovac, titular bishop of Budimlja (1939 - 1941)
 Valerijan (Stefanović), titular bishop of Budimlja (1941 - 1947)
 Makarije (Đorđević), diocesan bishop of Budimlja-Polimlje (1947 - 1956)
 German (Đorić), bishop administrator of Budimlja-Polimlje (1955 - 1956)
 Andrej (Frušić), titular bishop of Budimlja-Polimlje (1959-1961)
(Eparchy merged into Metropolitanate of Montenegro, Brda and the Littoral)
 Joanikije Mićović, titular bishop of Budimlja (1999–2001)
Eparchy of Budimlja and Nikšić renewed in 2001:
 Joanikije Mićović, as the diocesan bishop of Budimlja-Nikšić (2001-2021)
 Metodije Ostojić, diocesan bishop of Budimlja-Nikšić (since 2021)

Monasteries
Monasteries in the Budimlja-Nikšić diocese are:

See also
 List of eparchies of the Serbian Orthodox Church
 Eastern Orthodoxy in Montenegro

References

Bibliography

External links
 Official website
 SOC (2019): Thousands of faithful participating in the procession in honor of St. Basil of Ostrog
 

Serbian Orthodox Church in Montenegro
Religious sees of the Serbian Orthodox Church